Radio Cluj is a Romanian public radio station from Cluj-Napoca, broadcasting throughout Transylvania. It features Romanian and Hungarian language programmes.

References

External links 
 
 Article about Radio Cluj

Mass media in Cluj-Napoca
Romanian-language radio stations
Hungarian-language radio stations
Radio stations in Romania
Cluj